East Westwood is a neighborhood in Cincinnati, Ohio. The population was 2,458 at the 2020 Census.

Demographics

Source - City of Cincinnati Statistical Database

References

Neighborhoods in Cincinnati